Nong Chok is one of the 50 districts (khet) of Bangkok, Thailand. It is bounded by other districts (from north clockwise): Amphoe Lam Luk Ka of Pathum Thani province, Amphoe Bang Nam Priao and Amphoe Mueang Chachoengsao of Chachoengsao province, Lat Krabang, Min Buri and Khlong Sam Wa of Bangkok. It is the biggest (considered one in seven of all Bangkok) and the most sparsely populated district of Bangkok.

History
The district was established as an amphoe in 1897 during the reign of King Chulalongkorn. The original settlers were Muslims relocated from southern Thailand. In 1902, it became an amphoe of the newly setup Min Buri province. Due to economic hardship during 1930-31, Min Buri Province was disbanded in 1931 and Nong Chok was transferred to Chachoengsao Province. However the administration was moved under Bangkok the next year due to inconvenience of travel between Nong Chok and Chachoengsao. , about 75% of the population were Muslims while 22% were Buddhists. The name Nong Chok means water lettuce (Pistia stratiotes) swamp.

Administration
The district is sub-divided into eight sub-districts (Khwaeng).
Krathum Rai (กระทุ่มราย)
Nong Chok (หนองจอก)
Khlong Sip (คลองสิบ)
Khlong Sip Song (คลองสิบสอง)
Khok Faet (โคกแฝด)
Khu Fang Nuea (คู้ฝั่งเหนือ)
Lam Phak Chi (ลำผักชี)
Lam Toiting (ลำต้อยติ่ง)

Economy
Agriculture was and remains the most important part of Nong Chok economy. Rice, vegetables, fruits, and livestocks are the main products. It is famous for its gamecocks and birdcages. Many canals were dug for irrigation and transportation.

Places

Bangkok Arena
Mahanakorn University of Technology
Nong Chok National Football Center
Nong Chok Park
Wetchakarunrasm Hospital

Education

International schools include:
 Korean International School of Bangkok

References

External links
 BMA website with the tourist landmarks of Nong Chok
 Nong Chok district office (Thai only)

 
Districts of Bangkok